Conrad Weidenhammer (January 27, 1866 – January 19, 1919) was a farmer and provincial level politician from Alberta, Canada. He served as a member of the Legislative Assembly of Alberta from 1913 to 1917 sitting with the Conservative caucus.

Early life
Weidenhammer's wife gave birth to a daughter at Elmira, Ontario on March 24, 1896.

Political career
Weidenhammer ran for a seat to the Alberta Legislature in the 1905 Alberta general election. He ran as the Conservative candidate in the electoral district of Stony Plain but finished a distant third place, losing to Liberal candidate John McPherson.

McPherson and Weidenhammer would run against each other once again in the 1913 Alberta general election. This time Weidenhammer would defeat McPherson in a straight contest winning over 60% of the popular vote. It is said he had the broad support of the local German community during the election. Weidenhammer would serve out his term in office before retiring from Alberta provincial politics in 1917. He died in 1919.

References

External links
Alberta Legislative Assembly Members Listing

1866 births
Progressive Conservative Association of Alberta MLAs
1919 deaths